Ytre Øydnavatnet is a lake in the municipality of Lyngdal in Agder county, Norway. The  lake is located along the river Audna, just south of the lake Øvre Øydnavatnet.

See also
List of lakes in Norway

References

Audnedal
Lakes of Agder